Pichoy Airport  is an airport  northeast of Valdivia, a city in the Los Ríos Region of Chile. The airport lies next to Pichoy River.

Airlines and destinations

See also
Transport in Chile
List of airports in Chile

References

External links
Pichoy Airport at OurAirports

Pichoy Airport at FallingRain

Airports in Chile
Airports in Los Ríos Region